Rubens Francisco Lucchetti (born 29 January 1930,  in Santa Rita do Passa Quatro), better known as R. F. Lucchetti, is a Brazilian fiction writer, illustrator, writer and scripts for films, comic books and photo comics. Luchetti wrote more than 30 books under his name and over 1500 crime and horror fiction works under several pen names. He also wrote screenplays for films directed by José Mojica Marins and Ivan Cardoso.

Screenplays

Cinema 

 O Estranho Mundo de Zé do Caixão (1968, José Mojica Marins)
 Trilogia de Terror (1968,  José Mojica Marins), episode Pesadelo Macabro
 O Despertar da Besta (1969, José Mojica Marins)
 A Marca da Ferradura (1971, Nelson Teixeira Mendes)
 Finis Hominis (1971, José Mojica Marins)
 Sexo e Sangue na Trilha do Tesouro (1971, José Mojica Marins)
 A Herdeira Rebelde (1972,  Nelson Teixeira Mendes)
 Quando os Deuses Adormecem (1972, directed by José Mojica Marins)
 Exorcismo Negro (1974, José Mojica Marins)
 A Estranha Hospedaria dos Prazeres (1976, José Mojica Marins)
 Inferno Carnal (1976,  José Mojica Marins)
 Delírios de um Anormal (1978,José Mojica Marins)
 Mundo - Mercado do Sexo (1978,  José Mojica Marins)
 A Praga (1979,  José Mojica Marins)
 O Segredo da Múmia (1982,  Ivan Cardoso)
 Meu Homem, Meu Amante (1984,  Jean Garrett)
 No Mundo da Carochinha Volume I - Chapeuzinho Vermelho (1986, Wilson Rodrigues)
 No Mundo da Carochinha Volume II - Joãozinho e Maria (1986, Wilson Rodrigues)
 As Sete Vampiras (1986,  Ivan Cardoso)
 O Gato de Botas Extraterrestre (1989,  Wilson Rodrigues)
 O Escorpião Escarlate (1989,  Ivan Cardoso), based on the radio serial As Aventuras do Anjo
 Um Lobisomem na Amazônia (2005,  Ivan Cardoso), based on the novel A Amazônia Misteriosa by Gastão Cruls,

Radio 

 Grande Teatro de Aventuras (1956-1958, PRA-7 Rádio Clube de Ribeirão Preto)
 Grande Teatro A-7 (1956-1958, PRA-7 Rádio Clube de Ribeirão Preto)

Television 

 Quem Foi? (1961,TV Tupi, Canal 3, de Ribeirão Preto, 25 episodes)
 Além, Muito Além do Além (1967-1968, TV Bandeirantes, 34 episodes; directed by Antonino Seabra e Mário Pomponet)
 O Estranho Mundo de Zé do Caixão (1968, TV Tupi, twelve episodes; directed by Antônio Abujamra)

Pulp magazines 

 Policial  em Revista
 X-9
 Meia Noite
 Agentes da Lei
 Suspense
 Garras da Lei
 Emoção
 Contos de Mistério
 Mistério Jacques Douglas
 Ação policial
 Série Negra (1969, Saber, two issues)
 Aventura e Mistério (1969, Saber one issue)
 Mistérios (1969-1970, Editora Prelúdio, three issues)

Comics 

 A Cripta (1968–1969, Editora Taika, five issues, artwork by Nico Rosso)
 O Estranho Mundo de Zé do Caixão (1969, Editora Prelúdio, four issues; artwork by Nico Rosso)
 Special Sexta-Feira 13 (1969, Editora Sublime, one issue; artwork by Nico Rosso)
 O Homem do Sapato Branco (1969, Editora Prelúdio, three issues; artwork by Eugênio Colonnese). He signed the stories with the pen name R. Bava
 Edição Gigante de Impacto (1969, Editora Prelúdio, one issue; artwork by Eugênio Colonnese)
 A Vida de Sílvio Santos (1969, Editora Prelúdio,  one issue; artwork by Sérgio M. Lima)
 Histórias Que o Povo Conta (1970, Editora Prelúdio, three issues; artwork by Sérgio M. Lima)
 O Homem Que Matou o Homem Mau (1970, Editora Prelúdio, one issue; artwork by Sérgio M. Lima)
 Zé do Caixão no Reino do Terror (1970, Editora Prelúdio, two issues; artwork by Nico Rosso)
 O Filho de Satã (1970, Editora Taika, one issue; artwork by Nico Rosso). A graphic novel
 Carne Fresca para a Mesa! (1970, Editora Taika, one issue; artwork by Nico Rosso). A graphic novel
 Os Vampiros Não Praticam o Sexo! (1970, Editora Taika, one issue; artwork by Nico Rosso). A graphic novel
 Fantastykon Panorama do Irreal (1972, Edrel, two issues; artwork by Nico Rosso)
 Juvêncio, O Justiceiro(1968-1969, Editora Prelúdio, eight issues; artwork by Eugênio Colonnese e Rodolfo Zalla)
 O Gato (1967, Jotaesse Editora; artwork by Eugênio Colonnese)
 Spektro (Editora Vecchi)
 A Múmia (1977-1978, Bloch Editores, six issues artwork by Julio Shimamoto)
 Elvis Presley em Quadrinhos (1977, Bloch Editores,one issue; artwork by e José Menezes e Mário Lima)
 Frankenstein (1977, Bloch Editores, two issues; artwork by José Menezes)
 No Reino do Terror de R.F. Lucchetti (2001, Opera Graphica Editora, ne issue; artwork by Nico Rosso, Julio Shimamoto, Eugênio Colonnese, Rodolfo Zalla e Flávio Colin)
 45 Anos de Velta (2017, artwork by Emir Ribeiro)
 A Vida e os Amores de Edgar Allan Poe (2018, Sebo Clepsidra; úone issue; artwork by Eduardo Schloesser)

Books 

 Música Secreta (1952, Edição do Autor)
 Noite Diabólica - Contos Macabros (1963, Editora Outubro), horror anthology
 O Dôbre Sinistro (1963, Editora Outubro), horror
 O Ouro dos Mortos (1963, Editora Outubro), adventure
 Fim-de-Semana com a Morte (1972, Cedibra), crime
 Confissões de uma Morta (1972, Cedibra), crime
 Cerimônia Macabra (1972, Cedibra), horror anthology
 Sombras do Mal (1973, Cedibra), crime  with the pen name Sheila MacCarthy
 Os Amantes da Sra. Powers (1973, Cedibra), crime
 O Fantasma do Tio William (1974, Cedibra), romance
 O Caso do Manequim (1974, Cedibra), crime  with the pen name Mark Donahue
 O Homem Que Criou o Mito (1974, Cedibra)
 Feiticeiras do Amor (1974, Cedibra), romance with the pen name Ricardo Veronese
 A Última Noite de Amor (1974, Cedibra), romance with the pen name Frank Luke
 Sete Ventres para o Demônio (1974, Cedibra), horror
 A Maldição do Sangue de Lobo (1974, Cedibra), horror
 As Máscaras do Pavor (1974, Cedibra), horror
 Museu dos Horrores (1974, Cedibra), horror
 Os Vampiros Não Fazem Sexo (1974, Cedibra), horror with the pen name Brian Stockler
 A Lua do Lobisomem (1974, Cedibra), horror with the pen name Terence Gray
 Os Olhos do Vampiro (1974, Cedibra), horror with the pen name Theodore Field
 A Escrava de Satanás (1974, Cedibra), horror
 A Herdeira Rebelde (1974, Cedibra) - romance
 No Domínio do Mistério (1975, Cedibra), horror with the pen name Terence Gray
 A Volta de Frankenstein (1975, Cedibra), horror with the pen name Mary Shelby
 O Emissário de Satã (1975, Cedibra), horror
 Nos Domínios de Drácula (1975, Cedibra), horror
 O Demônio Exorcista (1975, Cedibra), horror with the pen name Peter L. Brady
 Sexo de Encomenda (1975, Cedibra), crime
 A Princesa das Sombras (1975, Cedibra), horror with the pen name Isadora Highsmith
 Trágica Obsessão (1975, Cedibra), horror with the pen name Isadora Highsmith
 O Castelo da Dama de Azul (1975, Cedibra), horror with the pen name Isadora Highsmith
 Crepúsculo Sobre a Neve (1975, Cedibra), horror with the pen name Isadora Highsmith
 Fogo Sagrado (1975, Cedibra), horror with the pen name Isadora Highsmith
 O Fantasma de Greenstock (1975, Cedibra), horror with the pen name Isadora Highsmith
 A Filha da Noite (1975, Cedibra), horror with the pen name Isadora Highsmith
 Em Nome do Amor (1975, Cedibra), romance with the pen name Christine Gray
 O Solar dos Gansfields (1975, Cedibra), horror with the pen name Christine Gray
 Noites Brancas em Dravko (1976, Cedibra), horror publicado sob pseudônimo de Isadora Highsmith
 Um Álibi de Amor (1976, Cedibra), crime  with the pen name Helen Barton
 A Justiça pelo Colt (1977, Cedibra), western  with the pen name William Sharp
 A Cidade dos Corruptos (1977, Cedibra), crime  with the pen name Ricardo Veronese
 Convite para a Morte (1977, Cedibra), crime  with the pen name J. Luther Brown
 A Ronda da Morte (1977, Cedibra) - crime  with the pen name J. Luther Brown
 Rota Sangrenta para Phoenix (1978, Cedibra), western  with the pen name Lee Sheridan
 Os Amantes de Sabrina (1978, Cedibra) - romance with the pen name Marcelo Francis
 O Crime da Gaiola Dourada (1979, Difel), crime
 Sedução à Italiana (1980, ZIP Editora), crime  with the pen name Janete Chantal
 As Virgens do Drácula (1980, Cedibra), horror with the pen name Erich Von Zagreb
 Gargantas Dilaceradas (1980, Cedibra), horror with the pen name Erich Von Zagreb
 A Noite do Vampiro (1980, Cedibra), horror with the pen name Erich Von Zagreb
 Orgia de Sangue (1980, Cedibra), horror with the pen name Erich Von Zagreb
 Sepulcro Maldito (1980, Cedibra), horror with the pen name Erich Von Zagreb
 Flor de Sangue (1980, Cedibra), horror with the pen name Erich Von Zagreb
 Cemitério sem Cruzes (1980, Cedibra), horror with the pen name Erich Von Zagreb
 Batismo das Feiticeiras (1980, Cedibra), horror with the pen name Erich Von Zagreb
 A Boneca dos Olhos Vazados (1980, Cedibra), horror with the pen name Erich Von Zagreb
 A Mansão do Fogo Eterno (1980, Cedibra), horror with the pen name Erich Von Zagreb
 Drácula (1987, Editora Cunha), horror/clássico de Bram Stocker recontado por Lucchetti
 Ivampirismo o Cinema em Pânico (1990, EBAL/Fundação do Cinema Brasileiro), with the screenplays of O Segredo da Múmia and As Sete Vampiras
 O Cavaleiro Solitário (1993, Editora Fittipaldi), western
 Ouro Maldito (1993, Editora Fittipaldi), western
 A Teia nas Sombras (1993, Editora Fittipaldi), crime
 O Segredo da Mansão (1994, Editora Fittipaldi), with the pen name Barbara Bialley
 Uma Sombra do Passado (1995, Editora Fittipaldi), mystery and suspense
 A Noite Tudo Encobre (1995, Editora Fittipaldi), crime with the pen name Frank King
 A Morte no Varieté (1995, Editora Fittipaldi), crime with the pen name Frank King
 Quem Quer Brincar Comigo? (1995, Editora Fittipaldi), crime with the pen name Frank King
 Os Eleitos da Morte (1995, Editora Fittipaldi), with the pen name Barbara Bialley
 Depois do Beijo, a Morte (1995, Editora Fittipaldi), crime with the pen name Barbara Bialley
 O Mestre da Vingança (1995, Editora Fittipaldi), with the pen name Constance Gray
 Um Morto em Minha Cama (1996, Editora Fittipaldi), crime  with the pen name Constance Gray
 O Homem que Caiu do Céu (1996, Editora Fittipaldi), with the pen name Constance Gray
 Os Extraordinários (2003, Opera Graphica Editora), action and adventure anthology
 Emir Ribeiro Ilustra Fantasmagorias de R. F. Lucchetti (2013, Editora Devaneio), horror anthology
 O Escorpião Escarlate, novelização do roteiro original (2015, Editora Laços), crime /original screenplay for the movie
 As Sete Vampiras (2016, Editora Laços), horror/original screenplay for the movie
 Onde Está Blondie? (2016, Editorial Corvo), satire/original unpublished film screenplay
 A Filha de Drácula (2017, Editorial Corvo), horror/original unpublished film screenplay
 5 Bonecas de Olhos Vazados (2017, Editorial Corvo), crime  and mystery
 Poemas de Vampiros (2018, Clepsidra), poetry
 Arthur, o Nascimento de uma Lenda (2018, Editorial Corvo)
 Procure a Mulher! (2018, Editorial Corvo), short story anthology
 A Mansão de Sorona (2019, Editorial Corvo), short story anthology (asome new, some reeditions)
 O Último Manuscrito do Dr. Watson (2019, Editorial Corvo), crime
 Mulheres-feras da Amazônia (2019, Editorial Corvo), horror(based on the original screenplay for the film Um Lobisomem na Amazônia (2005)

References

External links 
 
 

Brazilian science fiction writers
Brazilian horror writers
Brazilian translators
Brazilian crime fiction writers
Brazilian comics writers
Brazilian screenwriters
1930 births
Living people
Prêmio Angelo Agostini winners